Kim Min-ji (born 25 May 1985) is a retired South Korean female professional volleyball player.

She was part of the team at the 2011 FIVB Volleyball Women's World Cup.

Clubs
GS Caltex (2003-2012)

References

External links
 Player info FIVB

1985 births
Living people
South Korean women's volleyball players